Stjepan Radeljić (born 5 September 1997) is a Bosnian professional footballer who plays as a centre-back for Moldovan Super Liga club Sheriff Tiraspol.

Radeljić started his professional career at VfB Stuttgart II, before joining Osijek in 2018. He was loaned to Široki Brijeg in 2020 and to Sheriff Tiraspol in 2021. In 2022, he signed with Sheriff Tiraspol permanently.

Club career

Early career
Radeljić started playing football at Vitez, before joining Zrinjski Mostar's youth academy in 2014. In July 2016, he signed with German side VfB Stuttgart.

In June 2018, he moved to Croatian team Osijek. In January 2020, he was loaned to Široki Brijeg until the end of season. In July, his loan was extended for an additional season.

In February 2021, he was sent on a year-long loan to Moldovan outfit Sheriff Tiraspol, with an option to make the transfer permanent, which was activated in January 2022.

On 15 September, Radeljić debuted in UEFA Champions League against Shakhtar Donetsk.

International career
Radeljić represented Bosnia and Herzegovina at various youth levels.

Career statistics

Club

Honours
Sheriff Tiraspol
Moldovan Super Liga: 2020–21, 2021–22
Moldovan Cup: 2021–22

References

External links

1997 births
Living people
People from Travnik
Croats of Bosnia and Herzegovina
Bosnia and Herzegovina footballers
Bosnia and Herzegovina youth international footballers
Bosnia and Herzegovina under-21 international footballers
Bosnia and Herzegovina expatriate footballers
Association football central defenders
VfB Stuttgart II players
NK Osijek players
NK Široki Brijeg players
FC Sheriff Tiraspol players
Regionalliga players
First Football League (Croatia) players
Premier League of Bosnia and Herzegovina players
Moldovan Super Liga players
Expatriate footballers in Germany
Expatriate footballers in Croatia
Expatriate footballers in Moldova
Bosnia and Herzegovina expatriate sportspeople in Germany
Bosnia and Herzegovina expatriate sportspeople in Croatia
Bosnia and Herzegovina expatriate sportspeople in Moldova